Luke James Robinson (born 20 November 2001) is a professional footballer who plays as a defender for EFL League Two side Tranmere Rovers, on loan from  club Wigan Athletic.

Club career
Born in Birkenhead, Robinson played youth football for AC Hoylake, Wrexham and Wigan Athletic before starting a two-year scholarship deal with Wigan in summer 2018. He signed a two-and-a-half-year contract in March 2020. He made his debut for Wigan as a late substitute in a League One victory over Sunderland in December 2020.

In July 2022, Robinson signed a new two-year contract with Wigan. He proceeded to sign a season-long loan contract at Tranmere Rovers, his hometown club.

International career
He has played for Scotland internationally at under-18 and under-19 levels.

Career statistics

References

External links
 

2001 births
Living people
English footballers
Scottish footballers
Sportspeople from Birkenhead
Footballers from Merseyside
Association football defenders
Wigan Athletic F.C. players
Tranmere Rovers F.C. players
English Football League players
Scotland youth international footballers